The 2009 Pan American Judo Championships was held in Centro Nacional de Alto Rendimiento Deportivo in Buenos Aires, Argentina from 26 March to 27 March 2009.

Medal overview

Men's events

Women's events

Medals table

External links
 
 USA Judo

American Championships
Judo
Pan American Judo Championships
 Sports competitions in Buenos Aires
International sports competitions hosted by Argentina
Judo competitions in Argentina